Cyanolyca is a genus of small jays found in humid highland forests in southern Mexico, Central America and the Andes in South America. All are largely blue and have a black mask. They also possess black bills and legs and are skulking birds. They frequently join mixed-species flocks of birds.

Species

References

 
Bird genera
Higher-level bird taxa restricted to the Neotropics